Various lists of display resolutions:
 List of common resolutions
 Graphics display resolution

See also
 Display resolution